The following is an alphabetical list of subregions in the United Nations geoscheme for Asia, used by the United Nations and maintained by the UNSD department for statistical purposes.

Central Asia

Eastern Asia 

 
 
 
  Democratic People's Republic of Korea
 
 
  Republic of Korea

Note on Taiwan 
Several institutions and research papers using classification schemes based on the UN geoscheme include Taiwan separately in their divisions of Eastern Asia. (1) The Unicode CLDR's "Territory Containment (UN M.49)" includes Taiwan in its presentation of the UN M.49. (2) The public domain map data set Natural Earth has metadata in the fields named "region_un" and "subregion" for Taiwan. (3)The regional split recommended by Lloyd's of London for Eastern Asia (UN statistical divisions of Eastern Asia) contains Taiwan.  (4) Based on the United Nations statistical divisions, the APRICOT (conference) includes Taiwan in East Asia. (5) Studying Website Usability in Asia, Ather Nawaz and Torkil Clemmensen select Asian countries on the basis of United Nations statistical divisions, and Taiwan is also included. (6) Taiwan is also included in the UN Geoscheme of Eastern Asia in one systematic review on attention deficit hyperactivity disorder.

Northern Asia 

This subregion covers the entire geographical region of Siberia. Since this region as a whole falls under the transcontinental country of Russia, for statistical convenience, Russia is assigned under Eastern Europe by the UNSD, including both European Russia and Asian Russia under a single subregion. Hence there is no geopolitical entity that is currently grouped under Northern Asia.

South-eastern Asia 

This subregion covers the geographical regions of Indochinese Peninsula and Malay Archipelago, covering the following geopolitical entities as a whole:

Southern Asia 

This subregion covers the geographical regions spanning from the Iranian plateau till the Indian subcontinent, covering the following geopolitical entities as a whole:

Note on South Asia 

Southern Asia is not to be confused with South Asia, the former being a geographical subregion in Asia, and the latter usually signifying the geopolitical macroregion encompassing the SAARC countries (excluding Iran of Southern Asia). In the strictest/classical sense, South Asia is a political term which refers to the Indian subcontinent, and often used interchangeably depending on context.

Western Asia 

This subregion covers the geographical regions spanning from Anatolia, Caucasia, Levant, Mesopotamia till the Arabian Peninsula, covering the following geopolitical entities as a whole:

Note on West Asia 

Western Asia is not to be confused with West Asia (or precisely Southwest Asia), the former being a geographical subregion in Asia, and the latter signifying a geopolitical macroregion consisting of the Middle East and Caucasus countries in Asia (mainly including Iran from the Southern Asian subregion).

See also 
 List of continents and continental subregions by population
 List of countries by United Nations geoscheme
 United Nations geoscheme
 United Nations geoscheme for Africa, the Americas, Europe, and Oceania
 United Nations Statistics Division

References 

Asia
Geography of Asia